The J. F. Slater Memorial Museum, also known as Slater Memorial Museum, is a historic building and art museum on the grounds of the Norwich Free Academy in Norwich, Connecticut, built in 1885 and dedicated in 1886. It is designed in Richardsonian Romanesque architecture and is said to be the finest work of architect Stephen C. Earle.

It is a contributing property in the Chelsea Parade Historic District.

The museum was presented to the Norwich Free Academy by William A. Slater, son of John Fox Slater, who had endowed the school.

The museum features a collection of plaster casts of famous Roman, Greek, Egyptian and Renaissance statues. The museum also exhibits colonial and local historic artifacts, as well as 18th-to-20th-century American paintings and decorative arts, 17th-to-19th-century European paintings and decorative arts, African and Oceanic sculpture, and Native American objects. The adjacent Converse Art Gallery hosts six changing exhibitions throughout the year. The gallery, built in 1906, was designed by the leading local firm of Cudworth & Woodworth.

The museum is a member of the North American Reciprocal Museums program.

See also
John F. Slater House or Elks Club, also HABS documented, at 352 E. Main Street.

References

External links
Slater Memorial Museum at Norwich Free Academy
John Fox Slater Memorial Museum, at HABS

Museums in New London County, Connecticut
Richardsonian Romanesque architecture in Connecticut
Buildings and structures in Norwich, Connecticut
Art museums and galleries in Connecticut
History museums in Connecticut
Historic district contributing properties in Connecticut
Plaster cast collections
National Register of Historic Places in New London County, Connecticut